The term functional group may have several meanings:

Functional group, in organic chemistry, a group of atoms responsible for the characteristic chemical reactions of a molecule
Functional group (ecology), a collection of organisms
The Party of the Functional Groups, also known as Golkar, a political party in Indonesia

See also
 Function (disambiguation)
 Functional (disambiguation)
 Group (disambiguation)